Kashiya Yokocho (Penny Candy Lane) is a shopping street in Kawagoe City, Saitama Prefecture. Confectionery stores including penny candy stores line both sides of the street.

Origins and history 
The origin of the street dates back to 1796 (8th year of the Kansei Era), when Tozaemon Suzuki started to produce simple candies of Tokyoite choice in the present location, which flourished as the temple town of Yojuin temple. Later, the number of stores increased by sharing goodwill. After the Great Kanto Earthquake, this street manufactured and shipped Edo style candies such as Chitose Ame (red and white long stick candy), Kintarō-ame (long stick candy with Kintaro’s face), Mizu Yokan (soft adzuki-bean jelly) and Karinto (fried dough cookies) instead of devastated Tokyo.
In the early Showa Era, there used to be more than 70 stores. At present, some 20 stores keep making candies according to the traditional manufacturing method.
The street is stone-paved, whose quiet old atmosphere attracts tourists with its nostalgic feel. Kashiya Yokocho was chosen as one of the ‘100 Scent Sceneries’ by the Ministry of the Environment.

In June 2015, 5 stores burned down in a fire triggered by one of the candy stores there.

References

External links 

 Koedo Kawagoe Tourist Association 

Tourist attractions in Saitama Prefecture
Buildings and structures in Kawagoe, Saitama